James Ronald Chalmers (January 11, 1831April 9, 1898) was an American politician and senior officer of the Confederate States Army who commanded infantry and cavalry in the Western Theater of the American Civil War.

After the war, Chalmers served as a state senator in Mississippi and United States Congressman for several terms from the state's 6th congressional district, beginning in 1876. He was re-elected in 1880 but the election was contested by his Republican African-American opponent, John R. Lynch. Congress awarded the seat to Lynch because of marked election fraud by the Democrats. In 1882 Chalmers ran as an Independent Democrat on a fusionist ticket, with support by Republicans and Greenbackers. He contested the victory of the regular Democrat, and Congress finally awarded the seat to Chalmers, seating him in 1884. He left politics after losing election in the fall of 1884.

Early life, education and career
James Ronald Chalmers was born in Halifax County, Virginia, January 11, 1831. His father was Joseph Chalmers, who, having moved to Mississippi with his family when James was a boy, settled in Holly Springs in 1839. He was first appointed by the governor to fill a term, then elected by the state legislature as U. S. Senator. He was prepared for South Carolina College at Columbia, where he was graduated in 1851.

Chalmers returned to Holly Springs to read law with an established firm, and was admitted to the bar in 1853. After a few years of practice, Chalmers was elected as district attorney in 1858. In 1861 he was elected as a delegate to the convention which passed the ordinance of secession. Like his father an ardent States' rights Democrat, he voted in favor of secession.

American Civil War

Chalmers entered the Confederate States Army as a captain and was soon promoted to Colonel of the 9th Mississippi Infantry in 1861. For a while he commanded at Pensacola, Florida. On February 13, 1862, he was promoted to brigadier-general, and on April 6 was assigned to the command of Second Brigade, Withers' Division, Army of the Mississippi. He and his command did splendid fighting in the Battle of Shiloh. When Bragg was conducting operations in north Mississippi he sent Chalmers with a force of cavalry to make a feint upon Rienzi, Mississippi in order to cover the movement of a body of infantry to Ripley, Mississippi. In executing this order he encountered Sheridan, July 1, and a stubborn engagement took place. It lasted from about half-past eight in the morning till late in the afternoon. Chalmers, ascertaining that Sheridan had been reinforced by infantry and artillery, retired.

When Bragg advanced into Kentucky in the summer of 1862 Chalmers' command was a part of his force, performing its duties with courage and zeal. In the Battle of Murfreesboro he and his men again rendered brilliant service. In April, 1863, at the request of John C. Pemberton, he was transferred to the Department of Mississippi and East Louisiana and placed in command of the Fifth Military District. The district consisted of the top two tiers of counties in Mississippi. In 1864 he was assigned to the command of cavalry brigades of Jeffrey Forrest and McCulloch, forming the first division of Forrest's Cavalry Corps. This cavalry division was subsequently enlarged by the addition of Rucker's Brigade.

Chalmers bore a conspicuous part in the Battle of Fort Pillow and in all the campaigns of Forrest in north Mississippi, west Tennessee and Kentucky. He also led forces in Hood's Tennessee Campaign. On February 18, 1865, Chalmers was put in command of all the Mississippi cavalry in the Confederate service in Mississippi and west Tennessee.

Mississippi State Senate
In the waning days of the Reconstruction era, Chalmers was elected to the State Senate in 1875 and 1876. Democrats regained control of the House of Representatives in 1875 on the national level, for the first time since the Civil War. The campaign seasons in Mississippi were accompanied by increasing violence. Chapters of Red Shirts, a paramilitary group working for the Democratic Party that sought to disrupt and suppress Republican voting, helped Democrats win seats in Mississippi and the Carolinas.

U.S. House of Representatives
In 1876 Chalmers was elected as Representative from Mississippi's 6th congressional district to the Congress of the United States, serving in the Forty-fifth and Forty-sixth Congresses, from March 4, 1877 – March 3, 1881. His Republican opponent John R. Lynch contested the victory, as he was previously strongly elected from this black-majority district. With Congress dominated by Democrats, the Election Committee refused to hear the case.

Chalmers won re-election and received the certificate of election to the Forty-seventh Congress in 1880, serving from March 4, 1881 – April 29, 1882. That time his seat was successfully contested by Republican candidate Lynch.

Lynch served the remainder of the term.

In the fall of 1882, Chalmers ran as an Independent Democrat as part of a fusion ticket supported by Republicans and the Greenback Party, to the Forty-eighth Congress. Democrat Van H. Manning claimed victory, and Chalmers contested the legality of the election. Chalmers finally was verified by Congress as the winner and allowed to take his seat on June 25, 1884.  He was unsuccessful in running for re-election in 1884.

Chalmers wrote to Republican President Chester A. Arthur in December 1882 about how to defeat the regular Democrats in Mississippi. Independents like him sometimes affiliated with Greenbackers, other men who had left the regular party, and even Republicans in a fusionist ticket. In this period, Senator William Mahone of Virginia had gathered various factions into what was called the Readjuster Party, which was prominent in Virginia politics. Chalmers proposed the same for Mississippi. Neither he nor Mahone were successful in breaking up Mississippi Democrats or the Solid South.

Later life
After failing to win election in 1884, Chalmers left politics, returning to full-time practice of law. He moved his practice to Memphis, Tennessee, where he died in April 1898.

See also
 List of Confederate States Army generals
 List of United States representatives from Mississippi

References

Citations

Sources

Further reading
 Eicher, John H., and Eicher, David J. Civil War High Commands. Stanford University Press, 2001, .

External links

 
 James Ronald Chalmers at The Political Graveyard

 

1831 births
19th-century American lawyers
19th-century American politicians
1898 deaths
Burials in Tennessee
Cavalry commanders
Confederate States Army brigadier generals
Democratic Party members of the United States House of Representatives from Mississippi
Independent members of the United States House of Representatives
Mississippi Greenbacks
Mississippi Independents
Mississippi lawyers
People from Halifax County, Virginia
People of Mississippi in the American Civil War
Tennessee lawyers
University of South Carolina alumni